William Bedford (December 1885 – August 26, 1909) was an American Negro league second baseman who played in the 1900s.

A native of Illinois, Bedford played for the Birmingham Giants in 1908 and for the Cuban Giants in 1909. He died in Atlantic City, New Jersey in 1909 at age 23.

References

External links
Baseball statistics and player information from Baseball-Reference Black Baseball Stats and Seamheads

1885 births
1909 deaths
Date of birth missing
Birmingham Giants players
Cuban Giants players